Rhynchostylis retusa (also called foxtail orchid) is an orchid, belonging to the Vanda alliance. The inflorescence is a pendant raceme, consisting of more than 100 pink-spotted white flowers. It is famous for its use as a hair-ornament worn by Assamese women during folk dance Bihu on the onset of spring.

Distribution

It can be found in Bhutan, Cambodia, China (Guizhou, Yunnan), India, Indonesia, Laos, Malaysia, Myanmar, Nepal, Philippines, Singapore, Sri Lanka, Thailand, and Vietnam.

In India, the plant is most common in North-East, Orissa and Andhra Pradesh. In Andhra Pradesh, the plant is called by Telugu name Chintaranamu. Due to bio-piracy, the plant is on the verge of extinction in India. Rhychostylis retusa is recognized as the state flower of Arunachal Pradesh and Assam in India as well the Uva Province of Sri Lanka.

Care
The plant requires regular watering and applications of fertilizer throughout the year,  although it will die if the leaves are wet frequently. It prefers indirect lighting.  Flowering usually occurs in late spring.

Medicinal uses
In Malabar District various preparations of the plant were used against asthma and tuberculosis and for 'nervous twitchings' (referable possibly to tic disorder), cramp, epileptic spasms, vertigo, palpitations, kidney stone and menstrual disorder. The plant has also been used in Assam to treat wounds, cuts and bruises. The plant has been used as an emollient in India and Nepal. Under the name of rasna the root is used to treat rheumatism throughout the Indian subcontinent.

Significance in Assamese culture
The species is the state flower of Assam, where it is popularly known as কপৌ ফুল (Kopou Ful), and is an integral part of a Bihu dancer's attire. The plant is considered to be a symbol of love, fertility and merriment and is popular in Assamese wedding ceremonies.

Gallery

References

External links
 
 

retusa
Orchids of Asia
Flora of Assam (region)
Orchids of Bangladesh
Flora of Bhutan
Orchids of Cambodia
Orchids of China
Orchids of Assam
Orchids of Indonesia
Orchids of Laos
Orchids of Malaysia
Orchids of Myanmar
Orchids of Nepal
Orchids of the Philippines
Orchids of Singapore
Orchids of Sri Lanka
Orchids of Thailand
Orchids of Vietnam
Plants described in 1753
Taxa named by Carl Linnaeus